The Kars, known as the Kars Köpeği  in Turkish, is a breed of livestock guardian dog from eastern Turkey.

Overview
The Kars takes its name from the town of Kars in Kars Province, although it is also found throughout Ardahan, Artvin, Erzurum and Iğdır provinces in eastern Turkey. 

The Kars closely resembles the closely related Caucasian Shepherd Dog which is native to the Caucasus countries over Turkey's north-eastern border.

The Kars is used by local shepherds to protect their flocks from predation from various predators found in the region, anecdotes exist of several dogs repulsing and even killing bears.

See also
 Dogs portal
 List of dog breeds

References

Dog breeds originating in Turkey
Livestock guardian dogs